Gen. Joshua Barnes House is a historic house located along SR 1326 near Wilson, Wilson County, North Carolina.

Description and history 
It was built about 1844, and is a two-story, central-hall-plan, Greek Revival style frame dwelling. It was built around the nucleus of an earlier, Federal style dwelling built about 1830 and remodeled about 1870. It has a shallow hipped roof and one-story, full width front porch. Attached to the rear of the house is a small one-story Greek Revival frame structure connected by an enclosed breezeway. It was built by Gen. Joshua Barnes, who is considered the father of Wilson County.

It was listed on the National Register of Historic Places on February 13, 1986.

References

Houses on the National Register of Historic Places in North Carolina
Federal architecture in North Carolina
Greek Revival houses in North Carolina
Houses completed in 1844
Houses in Wilson County, North Carolina
National Register of Historic Places in Wilson County, North Carolina
Central-passage houses